Alexis Hellyer is an Australian Dressage rider. She competed at the 2018 FEI World Equestrian Games in Tryon, North Carolina and has won several international Grand Prix's in Australia with her horse Floreno. She runs an equestrian business in Moggill, Queensland, Australia.

References 

Living people
1989 births
Australian female equestrians
Australian dressage riders